Clepsis laetornata is a species of moth of the family Tortricidae. It is found in Yunnan, China.

The length of the forewings is 7–8 mm. The ground colour of the forewings is pale brown with a dark brown basal blotch, median fascia and subapical blotch. The basal portion of the costal edge is yellow-brown. The hindwings are pale grey, but the termen is somewhat yellow.

Etymology
The species name refers to the distinct basal blotch, median fascia and subapical blotch on the forewings and is derived from Latin laetus (meaning distinct) and ornatus (meaning ornate).

References

Moths described in 2003
Clepsis